Goose Creek is a stream in Madison County in the U.S. state of Missouri. It is a tributary of Saline Creek.

Goose Creek was so named on account of geese which were abundant near its course.

See also
List of rivers of Missouri

References

Rivers of Madison County, Missouri
Rivers of Missouri